Michael Hnatiuk, or Mykhailo Hnatiuk (Ukrainian: Михайло Гнатюк, born 1883 in Sasiv, Galicia, Austria-Hungary) was an Austrian-Hungarian Ukrainian officer and commander of a legion of the Ukrainian Sich Riflemen.

Biography 
Mykhailo Hnatiuk studied at the philosophical faculty of the University of Lviv.
 
He joined the Ukrainian Sich Riflemen in 1914. He was as first lieutenant the commander of a military engineering legion, which troops were riflemen that had recovered from illness or injury.
 
Hnatiuk emigrated to the United States. His further biography there is unknown.

Literature 
 М. Лазарович. 2005. Легіон Українських Січових Стрільців. Тернопіль: Джура.

References 

1883 births
People from Lviv Oblast
Ukrainian Austro-Hungarians
People from the Kingdom of Galicia and Lodomeria
Ukrainian anti-communists
Ukrainian people of World War I
Austro-Hungarian military personnel of World War I
Ukrainian people of the Polish–Ukrainian War
University of Lviv alumni
Polish emigrants to the United States
Year of death missing